Rękawczynek  is a village in the administrative district of Gmina Orchowo, within Słupca County, Greater Poland Voivodeship, in west-central Poland.

The village has a population of 80.

References

Villages in Słupca County